The Oklahoma Secretary of Commerce is a member of the Oklahoma Governor's Cabinet. The Secretary is appointed by the Governor, with the consent of the Oklahoma Senate, to serve at the pleasure of the Governor. The Secretary serves as the chief advisor to the Governor on economic development and trade promotion.

The current Secretary is Chad Mariska, who was appointed by Governor Kevin Stitt in 2022.

Overview
The Secretary of Commerce was established in 1986 to provide greater oversight and coordination to the State's economic development activities. The position was established, along with the Oklahoma Governor's Cabinet, by the Executive Branch Reform Act of 1986. The Act directed the Secretary to advise the Governor on economic development policy and advise the state's economic development agencies on new policy as directed by the Governor. As such, the Secretary is responsible for directing the State's development projects to economically distressed communities in order to generate new employment, help retain existing jobs and stimulate industrial and commercial growth. 

Oklahoma state law allows for Cabinet Secretaries to serve concurrently as the head of a State agency in addition to their duties as a Cabinet Secretary. Historically, the Secretary of Commerce has also served as the Director of the Oklahoma Department of Commerce. However, the current Secretary Sean P. Kouplen does not share this role, with the position Commerce Director currently filled by Brent Kisling.

The Secretary, unless filling an additional role which carries a greater salary, is entitled to annual pay of $70,000. Despite this law, if the Secretary serves as the head of a state agency, the Secretary receives the higher of the two salaries.

Agencies overseen
The Secretary of Commerce oversees the following state entities:
Department of Commerce
Department of Labor
Employment Security Commission
Housing Finance Agency
Workers' Compensation Commission

Budget
The Secretary of Commerce oversees a budget for Fiscal Year 2020 of $372 million. The budget authorization is broken down as follows:

List of Secretaries

References

External links
 Oklahoma Homeland Security Director Named, Oklahoma Office of Homeland Security, 1-20-04

Commerce
Commerce
Government agencies established in 1986
1986 establishments in Oklahoma